The Seedhill Football Ground was a football stadium in Nelson, Lancashire. It was the home of various incarnations of current North West Counties League Division One side Nelson F.C. from 1889, when the Burnley Express reported an opening senior fixture played against Burnley on March 16, 1889 (Lost 0-6), until 1971. During their tenure at Seedhill, Nelson were members of the English Football League between 1921 and 1931.  Nelson's last game at Seedhill was a Lancashire Combination fixture on Sunday 28 March 1971 against local rivals, Clitheroe F.C. Local newspaper, the Nelson Leader, reported that a crowd of over a thousand gathered to see Clitheroe beaten by five goals to three in what was not only the last game but also the first Sunday game at the stadium. Nelson then moved to their current Victoria Park ground on Lomeshaye Holme for the start of the 1971–72 season. Seedhill football ground was demolished in the early 1980s to make way for the M65 motorway.

The ground was situated next to the Seedhill Cricket Ground, currently the home of Lancashire League cricket team Nelson Cricket Club. Most of the land, on which the ground stood, is still undeveloped and the perimeter red brick wall is still visible on the Cricket Ground and Victoria Park sides. The land is currently used for the annual travelling fun fair which previously used the recreation ground on the opposite side of Carr Road until that was built on in the 1980s. In April 2009, the football club announced plans to return to the Seedhill site although this is yet to happen.

During the 1912–13 season, a two-storey brick-built pavilion was constructed at the town end of the ground which housed the changing rooms on the ground floor with the boardroom and an office on the upper floor. The pavilion, officially opened by Albert Smith MP on December 7, 1912, when Nelson beat Accrington Stanley 2-1 in a Lancashire Combination fixture, had a centre gable and a balcony overlooking the pitch. On 2 August 1913, the Burnley Express newspaper reported that, according to Nelson's annual financial statement, the cost of building the pavilion was £649.19s.7d. On 7 November 1932, the pavilion came close to burning down when a fire broke out in the boardroom. No-one was in the building at the time however heat from the fire burst a water pipe which put the fire out.

In 1921, with the help of volunteers, the covered terrace on the cricket field side was completed and was able to accommodate 3,000 people. In the same year, a wall was built around the park end and on the Carr Road side of the ground at a cost of £3,000. The cover over the cricket field side was blown down during a severe gale on the evening of 9 January 1936. The Burnley Express newspaper reported that the main gateway to the field on the Carr Road side was also blown down and damage was done to the fence on that side of the ground.

At the end of the 1922–23 Football League season, Nelson finished top of the Third Division North and were promoted to the Second Division, now known as the EFL Championship. Seedhill needed to be upgraded for the forthcoming season so, in 1923, a new wooden grandstand was built behind the existing stand on Carr Road. The new stand cost £5,000 to build and was able to accommodate 2,000 people on wooden bench seating. The old stand was dismantled and sold to Barnoldswick Town F.C.leaving a standing area in front of the new stand. Seedhill now had a capacity of 20,000.

Work started on the park end roof in September 1929 and was completed by November that year at a cost of £690 which was raised by the supporters' club. The cover provided accommodation for 5,000 people standing on a shallow-raked earth and cinder bank. This end of the ground became known as 'The Scratting Shed.' Concrete terracing was laid on the standing area in front of the main stand in June 1952. There was a spectator bank on each corner of the town end of the ground - the one nearest Carr Road had a wooden building at the top which was called the 'Alpine Bar'. The highest attendance at the stadium was 14,979 for the Third Division (North) match between Nelson and Bradford City on 27 April 1929.
 
The stadium was also used for Speedway and Stock Car racing from 1967, promoted by Mike Parker Promotions. The corner of the ground between the main stand and the park end served as the pits area for both speedway and stock cars. The speedway team, Nelson Admirals, eventually moved to Odsal Stadium, Bradford in 1970, though the stock cars remained until the stadium was demolished. The site is currently undeveloped and accommodates the annual Nelson travelling fun fair. There is currently an all weather athletics track and football pitch close to the site of Seedhill Stadium known as the Seedhill Athletics and Fitness Centre.This facility is located on the opposite side of the cricket field in Surrey Road and has never been home to Nelson Football Club.

References 

Defunct football venues in England
Nelson F.C.
Sports venues completed in 1905
Sports venues demolished in 1980
English Football League venues
Demolished sports venues in the United Kingdom
Defunct sports venues in Lancashire
1905 establishments in England
1980 disestablishments in England
Defunct speedway venues in England